The "San Marco" Marine Brigade (Italian: Brigata Marina "San Marco") is an amphibious formation of the Italian Navy, has been brigade since 2013 but the amphibious corps existed since 1915, reorganizing the Navy Landing Force. It has its command in Brindisi. They are the marines of the Italian Navy.

It is a joint formation, framed within the amphibious projection force, whose commander is the same admiral who serves as commander of the San Marco Brigade.

History 

On January 26th, the Regiment "La Marina" of the Kingdom of Sardinia (established in 1717) was expanded, becoming the Brigata di Marina: to the already existing regiment of sailors, was also added an infantry regiment. With this distribution, the formation participated in the 1848 at the First Italian War of Independence, distinguishing itself in the battles of Novara, Goito, Pastrego and Peschiera, and later was dissolved. Recognized as a Regiment in the 1861 in the Italian Royal Navy, it joined the battle of Lissa and then it was dissolved again in the 1878, following the will of the Italian Admiral Benedetto Brin. 

The formation previously known as the San Marco Battalion later became the San Marco Regiment in the 1990s.

A joint Italian-Spanish landing force (SILF - Spanish Italian Landing Force) was established on 23 November 1996, in order to operate in international combat theaters on behalf of NATO.

The SILF was structured in the form of an amphibious brigade, consisting of two manoeuvre units, one being "San Marco" Regiment, of marine infantry, artillery, anti-armour and air defense weapons, reconnaissance and demolition, engineers, helicopters and air support, IFVs and assault vehicles.

On 1 October 1999, the Landing Force of the Navy was created, under the command of a Rear Admiral, stationed in Brindisi Naval Base and formed in two regiments: the "San Marco" Regiment and the "Carlotto" Regiment, both controlled by a Captain, and the Landing Craft Group, commanded by a Commander.

The Landing Force was renamed from 1 March 2013 as "San Marco" Marine Brigade, still being based in Brindisi, but consisting of three regiments, totalling about 3,800 marines. It is commanded by an Admiral, reporting directly to the Commander in Chief of the Italian Navy Fleet Command (CINCNAV).

Organization 

The brigade is organized as follows:

San Marco Marine Brigade 
The San Marco Marine Brigade and the Navy's 3rd Naval Division form together with the Italian Army's Cavalry Brigade "Pozzuolo del Friuli" the Italian military's National Sea Projection Capability (Forza di proiezione dal mare).

 San Marco Marine Brigade (Brigata Marina San Marco - COMFORSBARC), in Brindisi
 Brigade Headquarters (Quartier Generale della Brigata Marina San Marco - QUARTGEN Brigata Marina San Marco), in Brindisi
 Amphibious Integration Centre (Centro Integrazione Anfibia), in Brindisi
 Command Support Battalion (Battaglione Supporto al Comando), in Brindisi
 C4 Company
 Technical Support Company
 Training Battalion "Caorle" (Battaglione Scuole "Caorle"), in Brindisi
 Formation Company
 Training, Instruction, Specialization Company
 Pedagne Team, manages the Pedagne Islands training area
 Navy Landing Craft Group (Gruppo mezzi da sbarco della Marina Militare), in Brindisi - mans the landing craft of the amphibious ships and manages the ship-to-beach traffic
 Propulsion and Vessels Section
 Maritime Section
 Beach Organization Section
 Landing Craft Team, with 9x LCM62-class Landing Craft Mechanized, 4x LCM23-class Landing Craft Mechanized
 Boat Team, with 20x MTP96-class Landing Craft Vehicle Personnel

1st San Marco Regiment 
 1st San Marco Regiment (1° Reggimento San Marco), in Brindisi - amphibious landing force
 Command Unit (Reparto Comando)
 Command Company with an Air Support Element team
 Signal Company
 Paratroopers Swimmers Company
 2x Reconnaissance platoons, 2x SALT platoons (Supporting Arms Liaison Team)
 EOD/IEDD Engineer Platoon
 FHT Platoon (Field HUMINT Team)
 1st Assault Battalion "Grado" (1° Battaglione Assalto "Grado")
 1st Assault Company "Bafile"
 3x Assault platoons, 1x support weapons platoon
 2nd Assault Company "Tobruk"
 3x Assault platoons, 1x support weapons platoon
 Support Weapons Company
 1x Command support platoon, 1x AAV7-A1 platoon with amphibious assault vehicles (will be replaced with Amphibious Combat Vehicles)
 2nd Assault Battalion "Venezia" (2° Battaglione Assalto "Venezia")
 3rd Assault Company "An Nassiriya"
 3x Assault platoons, 1x support weapons platoon
 4th Assault Company "Monfalcone"
 3x Assault platoons, 1x support weapons platoon
 Support Weapons Company
 1x Command support platoon, 1x AAV7-A1 platoon with amphibious assault vehicles (will be replaced with Amphibious Combat Vehicles)
 3rd Combat Logistic Support Battalion "Golametto" (3° Battaglione Supporto Logistico al Combattimento "Golametto")
 Command Support Platoon
 Logistic Company
 Tactical Transport Company
 Medical Company

2nd San Marco Regiment 
 2nd San Marco Regiment (2° Reggimento San Marco), in Brindisi - maritime interdiction operations and embarked naval protection teams
 Mobility Team
 Naval Operations Battalion (Battaglione Operazioni Navali), in Brindisi
 2x Naval operations companies, each with 10x ship teams
 Interdiction and Protection Battalion (Battaglione Interdizione e Protezione), in Brindisi
 Force Protection Company, with 10x teams
 Port Protection Company, with 10x teams

3rd San Marco Regiment 
 3rd San Marco Regiment (3° Reggimento San Marco), in Taranto - installations defense service (Servizio difesa installazioni - SDI)
 1st Honor Guard Company, in Taranto
 National Emergencies Company (Naval civil protection), in Taranto
 K9 Unit, in Taranto
 SDI Battalion North (Battaglione SDI Nord), in La Spezia
 Command Support Team
 Telecommunications Team
 SDI Company Liguria, in La Spezia
 3x SDI platoons: in La Spezia (Military Harbour), Luni (Navy Helicopter Station), and Ancona (Ammunition Depot Poggio)
 SDI Company Sardinia, in La Maddalena
 3x SDI platoons: at La Maddalena (Non-commissioned Officers School), Santo Stefano (Ammunition Depot), and Tavolara (NATO Very Low Frequency Station)
 SDI Battalion Centre - Rome (Battaglione SDI Centro - Roma), in Rome
 Command Support Team
 Telecommunications Team
 SDI Company Rome, at the Navy General Staff
 SDI Battalion South (Battaglione SDI Sud), in Taranto
 Command Support Team
 Telecommunications Team
 SDI Company Taranto, in Taranto
 3x SDI platoons: in Taranto (Military Harbour), Grottaglie (Navy Helicopter Station), and Pozzuoli (Ammunition Depot Montagna Spaccata)
 SDI Company Brindisi, in Brindisi
 3x SDI platoons: in Brindisi (Military Harbour), Mesagne (Ammunition Depot), and at the San Marco Marine Brigade headquarter
 SDI Company Sicily, in Augusta
 4x SDI platoons: in Augusta (Military Harbour), Priolo Gargallo (Ammunition Depot Cava di Sorciaro), Catania (Navy Helicopter Station), and the NATO Pier in Augusta

3rd Naval Division 

The brigade is transported by the navy's 3rd Naval Division, co-located with the brigade in Brindisi, which consists of the following ships:

 Aircraft carrier: Giuseppe Garibaldi (will be replaced in June 2022 by landing helicopter dock Trieste)
 San Giorgio-class amphibious transport docks: San Giorgio, San Marco, San Giusto

Equipment 
 Beretta 92FS service pistol
 Heckler & Koch MP5A3 submachine gun
 Beretta ARX160 service rifle
 GLX-160 underslung grenade launcher for the ARX160
 FN Minimi light machine gun
 MG 42/59 machine gun
 M2 heavy machine gun
 Panzerfaust 3 anti-tank rocket
 Spike anti-tank guided missile
 FIM-92 Stinger man-portable air-defense system
 81mm mortars
 120mm mortars

See also 
 Italian Navy
 San Marco Regiment
 Lagunari
 Marines

Notes 

Marina Militare
Military units and formations established in 2013
Italian Marines

de:San-Marco-Brigade